The 1988 Miller High Life 400 was a NASCAR Winston Cup Series race that took place on June 26, 1988, at Michigan International Speedway in Brooklyn, Michigan. An unrelated race with the same sponsor was implemented on September 11, 1988, at Richmond International Raceway in Richmond, Virginia.

Background
Opened in 1968, the track's turns are banked at eighteen degrees, while the 3,600-foot-long front stretch, the location of the finish line, is banked at twelve degrees. The back stretch, has a five degree banking and is 2,242 feet long.

Race report
Rusty Wallace defeated Bill Elliott by a time of 0.28 seconds in front of an audience of 68,000. Wallace's first victory out of the five that he would accumulate at Michigan International Speedway would be credited to his methods of fuel conservation. Wallace ran out of fuel in turn 2 of lap 129. He had a large enough lead to coast back to the pits and not lose a lap. Four cautions were given for 15 laps while 13 lead changes were made. The race took two hours and thirty-six minutes to complete.

Rick Wilson was the last-place finisher due to an engine issue on lap 3 of 200 with two more engine failures happening on laps 44 and 167. Dale Jarrett was the only driver to retire from an accident; he would crash his vehicle in turn 4 of lap 156. Mike Alexander's first race subbing for Bobby Allison ends with a top-10 finish. Richard Petty had a pretty fast car, running in the top-10 and top-5 for the majority of the race before the engine dropped a cylinder late causing him to limp to a disappointing 24th place finish.

Elmer Simko would make his last appearance as a NASCAR team owner at this event. He would go on to purchase the Owosso Speedway in Ovid, Michigan shortly after retiring from NASCAR. This would be the best career finish in four starts for Dana Patten with a 22nd-place finish. There was a 41-driver grid of American-born males. Only 25 of these drivers finished the race.

David Simko would retire from NASCAR Cup Series racing after this event; finishing 40th in the process. David Sosebee would also retire after this race; completing the race in 31st place.

Notable crew chiefs in attendance for this race were Junie Donlavey, Darrell Bryant, Joey Arrington, Andy Petree, Jimmy Means, Dale Inman, Travis Carter, Elmo Langley among others.

Jimmy Horton, Jay Sommers, J.D. McDuffie, and Connie Saylor would fail to qualify for this race. Individual earnings for each driver ranged from the winner's share of $64,100 ($ when adjusted for inflation) to the last-place finisher's share of $3,050 ($ when adjusted for inflation). The total prize purse for this event was advertised at $440,975 ($ when adjusted for inflation).

Finishing order

Timeline
Section reference:

Standings after the race

References

Miller High Life 400 (June)
Miller High Life 400 (June)
NASCAR races at Michigan International Speedway